Starley may refer to:

Starley (singer) (born 1987), Australian singer
James Starley (1830–1881), English inventor and father of the bicycle industry
John Kemp Starley (1855–1901), English inventor and industrialist who is widely considered the inventor of the modern bicycle